Listed below are the UCI Women's Teams that competed in the 2009 women's road cycling events organized by the International Cycling Union (UCI) including the 2009 UCI Women's Road World Cup.

Teams overview

Riders

Lotto–Belisol Ladiesteam

Lizzie Armitstead
Evelyn Arys
Sofie De Vuyst
Catherine Delfosse
Elise Depoorter
Rochelle Gilmore
Vera Koedooder
Lien Lanssens
Emma Mac Kie
Kim Schoonbaert
Emma Silversides
Linn Torp
Annelies van Doorslaer
Grace Verbeke

Vision 1 Racing

Ages as of 1 January 2009.

Cervélo TestTeam

 Katharina Alberti
 Kristin Armstrong
 Emilie Aubry
 Regina Bruins
 Lieselot Decroix
 Sandra Dietel
 Sarah Düster
 Claudia Lichtenberg
 Emma Pooley
 Carla Ryan
 Pascale Schnider
 Patricia Schwager
 Christiane Soeder
 Élodie Touffet
 Kirsten Wild

Team Columbia–High Road Women

Ages as of 1 January 2009.

Source

Selle Italia–Ghezzi

Ages as of 1 January 2009.

Team Cmax Dilà

Ages as of 1 January 2009.

USC Chirio Forno d'Asolo

DSB Bank–LTO

Lizzie Armitstead
Evelyn Arys
Sofie De Vuyst
Catherine Delfosse
Elise Depoorter
Rochelle Gilmore
Vera Koedooder
Lien Lanssens
Emma Mac Kie
Kim Schoonbaert
Emma Silversides
Linn Torp
Annelies van Doorslaer
Grace Verbeke

Red Sun Cycling Team

  Anne Arnouts
  Latoya Brulee
  Paulina Brzeźna
  Petra Dijkman
  Maxime Groenewegen
  Elise van Hage
  Ludivine Henrion
  Emma Johansson
  Inge Klep
  Daniëlla Moonen
  Mascha Pijnenborg
  Moniek Rotmensen
  Laure Werner

Team Flexpoint

Ages as of 1 January 2009.

Petrogradets

Ages as of 1 January 2009.

Bigla Cycling Team

Ages as of 1 January 2009.

References

2009 in women's road cycling
2009